Premich is a river of Bavaria, Germany. It arises from the confluence of Kellersbach and Kleiner Steinach near the village Premich, part of Burkardroth. It flows into the Franconian Saale in Steinach an der Saale, part of Bad Bocklet.

Inflows 
 Schmalwasserbach (left)

See also
List of rivers of Bavaria

References

Rivers of Bavaria
Rivers of Germany